Yishai Sarid is an Israeli author, novelist and lawyer. His second book, Limassol, became an international best-seller. His fourth book, The Third, became a major subject of public and literary discussion in Israel and won the Bernstein literary award. His fifth book, The memory monster, was included on the New York Times list of 100 notable books of 2020. Sarid works also as an attorney, formerly as a public prosecutor and now privately.

Biography
Sarid was born and raised in Tel Aviv, Israel in 1965. He is the son of senior politician and journalist Yossi Sarid.
Between 1974-1977 he lived with his family in the northern town of Kiryat Shmona, near the Lebanon border. Sarid was recruited to Israeli Army at 1983, and served for 5 years. During his service he finished the IDF's officers school, and served as an intelligence officer. He studied law at the Hebrew University of Jerusalem. During 1994-1997 he worked for the Government as an Assistant District Attorney in Tel-Aviv, prosecuting criminal cases.  Sarid has a Public Administration master's degree (MPA) from the Kennedy School of Government at Harvard University (1999). Nowadays he is an active lawyer and arbitrator, practicing mainly civil and administrative law. His law office is located in Tel-Aviv. Along with his legal career, Sarid writes literature, and so far has published six novels. Sarid is married to Dr. Racheli Sion-Sarid, a critical care pediatrician, and they have 3 children.

Bibliography
The Investigation of Captain Erez, Yedioth Ahronoth, 2000. A female soldier accuses an officer of raping her, and a young lawyer is called to investigate the case. The book was published also in France.
Limassol , Am Oved, 2009. It was translated to 8 languages, won the Grand Prix de litterature policiere in France (2011) and was shortlisted to the Irish IMPAC prize. It tells the story of a secret service agent getting involved in a plot with an ailing Palestinian poet from Gaza, his exiled terrorist son, and an Israeli female peace activist.
Naomi's Kindergarten, Am Oved, 2013. A story of one crucial year in the life of a Tel Aviv preschool assistant. It was shortlisted for the Sapir literary prize in Israel, and published also in German. 
The Third, Am Oved, 2015. The story takes place in the Third Temple built in Jerusalem, after the state of Israel is replaced by the religious kingdom of Judea. It became a best seller in Israel and has been a subject to a significant public discussion there, due to its relevance to cultural, political and religious issues that dominate Israeli society. It won the Bernstein literary award. It has been published in translation to French and Italian.
 The Memory Monster, Am Oved, 2017. A report written by a young historian to the chairman of the Yad Vashem (Israel's national Holocaust memorial authority), about the way his life has become trapped in the memory of the Holocaust dure to his work as a guide to the sites of Nazi German extermination camps in Poland. It was included on the New York Times list of 100 notable books of 2020and translated to 8 languages. The novel was adapted to a monodrama by the actor Ben Yosepovitch and presented by Israel's national theatre "Habima". 
Victorious, Am Oved, 2020. A veteran military psychologist, specializing in the mental training of combat soldiers, is consulting the chief of staff of Israeli Army how to win the next war. When her son is recruited to combat duty, a conflict of duties emerges.

References

External links
Yishai Sarid's law firm website - Yishai Sarid & Neria Haroeh, Adv.

1965 births
People from Tel Aviv
Israeli Jews
Israeli novelists
Jewish novelists
Living people
Israeli people of Polish-Jewish descent
Hebrew University of Jerusalem Faculty of Law alumni
Harvard Kennedy School alumni